All My Relations is an album by the jazz saxophonist Charles Lloyd, recorded in July 1994 by Lloyd with Bobo Stenson, Anders Jormin and Billy Hart.

Reception

The AllMusic review by Scott Yanow called the album "a strong effort".

Track listing
All compositions by Charles Lloyd

 "Piercing the Veil" - 8:31
 "Little Peace" - 6:35
 "Thelonious Theonlyus" - 7:48
 "Cape to Cairo Suite (Hommage to Mandela)" - 15:26  
 "Evanstide, Where Lotus Bloom" - 10:56  
 "All My Relations" - 10:54
 "Hymne to the Mother" - 8:38
 "Milarepa" - 1:19

Personnel
Charles Lloyd - tenor saxophone, flute, Tibetan oboe
Bobo Stenson - piano
Anders Jormin - double bass
Billy Hart - drums

References

1995 albums
ECM Records albums
Albums produced by Manfred Eicher
Charles Lloyd (jazz musician) albums